Ma On Shan may refer to:

 Ma On Shan (peak), a mountain in the New Territories of Hong Kong
 Ma On Shan (town), a New Town in the New Territories on the foot of Ma On Shan mountain
 Ma On Shan station, an elevated train station in Hong Kong
 Ma On Shan Village, a historic mining village in Hong Kong

See also
 
 Ma'anshan, a city in Anhui Province, People's Republic of China